Captain's Orders is a 1937 British drama film directed by Ivar Campbell and starring Henry Edwards, Jane Carr, Marie La Varre, Wally Patch and Basil Radford. The film's sets were designed by Clifford Pember, in his final production.

Cast
 Henry Edwards - Captain Trent
 Jane Carr - Belle Mandeville
 Marie La Varre - Violet Potts
 Franklin Dyall - Newton
 Wally Patch - Johnstone
 C. Denier Warren - Lawson
 Mark Daly - Scotty
 Roddy Hughes - Cookie
 Basil Radford - Murdoch
 Kim Peacock - Aubrey Chaytor
 Joss Ambler - Randolph Potts
 H. F. Maltby - Director

References

External links
 

1937 films
1937 drama films
British drama films
Films directed by Ivar Campbell
British black-and-white films
1930s English-language films
1930s British films